Culross mercat cross is located in Culross, Fife, Scotland. Now Category A listed, its base dates to the original 16th-century  mercat cross. Its shaft and capital, meanwhile, are 1902 replacements, the work of John William Small (architect) and Alexander Neilson (sculptor).

The cubical head has decorations on each face:

Northeast: Culross Burgh arms with the date of the burgh's 1588 creation
Southeast: the provost's initials and inscription ("Restored by the Honourable Sir James Sivewright of Tulliallan, 1 July 1902, and John Cunningham of Balgownie Provost")
Southwest: monogram of King James VI with crown
Northwest: Sir James Sivewright's coat of arms, with his initials in tympanum

A unicorn surmounts the capital.

Architectural detail

See also
 List of listed buildings in Culross, Fife
 List of Category A listed buildings in Fife

References

Buildings and structures in Culross
Category A listed buildings in Fife
16th-century establishments in Scotland
Monumental crosses in Scotland